Tughril II ( 1109 – October–November 1134) was the Sejluk sultan of Persian Iraq briefly in 1132. He maintained power through the support of his uncle, the principal Seljuk sultan Ahmad Sanjar; when the latter left for Transoxiana to suppress a rebellion in 1132, Tughril II lost Iraq to his rival and brother Ghiyath ad-Din Mas'ud. Tughril II briefly took refuge in the domain of the Bavandid ispahbad (ruler) Ali I in Mazandaran, where he stayed during the whole winter of 1132–1133. He subsequently captured the capital Hamadan, but was stricken with sickness and died on his arrival to the capital, in October/November 1134. Tughril II was survived by his son Arslan, who was raised by the atabeg Eldiguz, who installed him on the throne in 1161.

Family
One of his wives was the sister of Izz al-Din Hasan Qipchaq, one of the powerful amirs of the time. They married in 1188–9. Another wife was Mumina Khatun. She was the mother of his son, Arslan-Shah. After Tughril's death, Sultan Ghiyath ad-Din Mas'ud gave her to Sham al-Din Eldiguz. He took her to Barda. With him, she had two sons, the Atabeg Muhammad Jahan Pahlavan and Atabeg Qizil Arslan. His only daughter married Jalal al-Din Mangubirni.

References

Sources 
 
 
 
 

1109 births
1134 deaths
Seljuk rulers